William Higgin (1793 – 12 July 1867) was the 18th Bishop of Limerick, Ardfert and Aghadoe from 1849 until 1843, when he was translated to Derry and Raphoe.

Higgin was educated at Trinity College, Cambridge, graduating BA as 13th wrangler in 1813. He was the incumbent at Roscrea from 1828 to 1835 when he became Vicar general of Killaloe. In 1844 he became Dean of Limerick, his last post before elevation to the episcopate.

Higgin was nominated to Derry and Raphoe on 18 November 1853 and appointed there by letters patent dated 7 December 1853.

References

1793 births
1867 deaths
Alumni of Trinity College, Cambridge
Deans of Limerick
19th-century Anglican bishops in Ireland
Bishops of Limerick, Ardfert and Aghadoe
Bishops of Derry and Raphoe
Diocese of Limerick, Ardfert and Aghadoe